Live at the Hilcrest Club 1958 (originally released in 1970 by America Records as The Fabulous Paul Bley Quintet) is a live album by pianist Paul Bley, saxophonist Ornette Coleman, trumpeter Don Cherry, drummer Billy Higgins and bassist Charlie Haden recorded in California in 1958 and released on the Inner City label in 1976. The album was the first live recording of Ornette Coleman, made shortly after he recorded his first album, Something Else!!!! and featuring the group (without Bley) that would soon record the Atlantic albums The Shape of Jazz to Come (1959) and Change of the Century (1960).

Reception

Village Voice critic Robert Christgau rated the album an "A" on its release observing: "I have the feeling when I want people to understand what free jazz meant, this is what I'll play". The Allmusic reviewer wrote: "The recording quality is decent for the period, and avant-garde collectors will want to search for this pioneering effort". According to The Penguin Guide to Jazz: "This is clearly an important record and, technical difficulties aside, it should be in all modern collections. However, it isn't central to Bley's recorded output".

Track listing
All compositions by Ornette Coleman except as indicated
 "Klactoveesedstene" (Charlie Parker) – 12:04
 "I Remember Harlem" (Roy Eldridge) – 3:48
 "The Blessing" – 9:35
 "Free" – 5:39

Personnel 
Paul Bley – piano
Ornette Coleman – alto saxophone
Don Cherry – cornet
Charlie Haden – bass  
Billy Higgins – drums

References 

1970 live albums
Paul Bley live albums
Ornette Coleman live albums
Inner City Records live albums